Billie Jean King and Betty Stöve were the defending champions but only Betty Stöve competed that year with Françoise Dürr.

Françoise Dürr and Betty Stöve lost in the final 6–2, 6–3 against Margaret Court and Virginia Wade.

Seeds

Draw

Finals

Top half

Bottom half

References

External links
1973 French Open – Women's draws and results at the International Tennis Federation

Women's Doubles
French Open by year – Women's doubles
1973 in women's tennis
1973 in French women's sport